Joseph-Georges-Gilles-Claude Lamontagne  (April 17, 1919 – June 14, 2016) was a Canadian politician and the 24th Lieutenant Governor of Quebec.

Early life
He was born in Montreal. During World War II, Lamontagne served as a bomber pilot in the Royal Canadian Air Force with No 425 Squadron and was later shot down over the Netherlands in 1943, being detained as a prisoner of war until May 1945. He ended his air force service with the rank of flight lieutenant. In 1946, he settled in Quebec City and entered the importing business. He became a member of the Rotary Club of Quebec City with his partner and neighbour Jean Poliquin.

Career
He entered politics and was elected mayor of Quebec City in 1965. He held that post until he won a seat in the House of Commons of Canada as a Liberal Party candidate in a 1977 by-election. In 1978, he entered the Cabinet of Prime Minister Pierre Trudeau, serving briefly as a Minister without Portfolio before becoming Postmaster General. He served in that position until the defeat of the government in the 1979 election. When the Liberals returned to power in the 1980 election, Lamontagne returned to Cabinet as Minister of National Defence.

Lieutenant-Governor of Quebec (1984–90)
In 1984, he left politics to accept the position of Lieutenant-Governor of Quebec, and served as the province's viceroy until his retirement in 1990.

Personal life
Lamontagne married Mary Schaefer in 1949 and had four children and five grandchildren. Schaefer died in 2006. Lamontagne died in 2016 at the age of 97. In 1990, he was made an Officer of the Order of Canada. In 2000, he was made a Knight of the National Order of Quebec and in 2005, a member of l'Ordre des Grands Québécois. He was an honorary member of the Royal Military College of Canada club student # H15200.

Arms

Archives 
There is a Gilles Lamonagne fonds at Library and Archives Canada and the Quebec City archives.

See also
List of mayors of Quebec City

References

External links

1919 births
2016 deaths
Canadian World War II pilots
Shot-down aviators
Canadian prisoners of war in World War II
Knights of the National Order of Quebec
Liberal Party of Canada MPs
Lieutenant Governors of Quebec
Mayors of Quebec City
Members of the House of Commons of Canada from Quebec
Members of the King's Privy Council for Canada
Officers of the Order of Canada
Politicians from Montreal
Postmasters General of Canada
Royal Canadian Air Force officers
World War II prisoners of war held by Germany
French Quebecers
Defence ministers of Canada